Joan Blanchette Broderick is a professor of chemistry and biochemistry at Montana State University known for her work on bioinorganic chemistry, especially the chemistry of iron-sulfur interactions. She was elected a member of the National Academy of Sciences in 2022.

Education and career 
Broderick has an undergraduate degree from Washington State University, and an M.S. and a PhD from  Northwestern University. Following her Ph.D., she was a postdoc at Massachusetts Institute of Technology and then an assistant professor at Amherst College. She held a faculty position at Michigan State University before moving to Montana in 2005. 

She has been recognized as a Saltman Lecturer and Women in Science Distinguished Professor at Montana State University. In 2019, Broderick received the Alfred Bader Award in Bioinorganic or Bioorganic Chemistry from the American Chemical Society.

Research 
She has contributed to bioinorganic chemistry often with a focus on iron-sulfur proteins, including the radical SAM enzymes. Her research also includes investigations into hydrogenase where she defines the assembly of the enzymes into functional units.

Selected publications

References

External links 

Year of birth missing (living people)
Living people
Women biochemists
American biochemists
Northwestern University alumni
Montana State University faculty
Michigan State University faculty
Members of the United States National Academy of Sciences